Luis Roberts (born 24 March 2002) is a Wales international rugby league footballer who plays as a  or er for the Leeds Rhinos in the Super League.

He previously played for Salford Red Devils  in the Betfred Super League; and Swinton Lions, Leigh Centurions, and Widnes Vikings in the Betfred Championship.

Background
Roberts is of Welsh heritage and has featured for Wales at both junior and senior level.

Career

Salford Red Devils
Roberts featured in a one off match for new expansion club, Valencia Huracanes in a loss to Featherstone Rovers.
Roberts made his Super League debut in round 14 of the 2020 Super League season for Salford against the Warrington Wolves.

Swinton Lions
On 10 September 2020, it was announced that Roberts would join Swinton for the 2021 season in the RFL Championship. He was nominated for the 2021 Championship Young  Player of the Year award.

Leigh Centurions
On 28 October 2021, it was reported that he had signed for the Leigh Centurions in the 2022 RFL Championship.

Widnes Vikings (loan)
On 23 June 2022, it was announced that he would join the Widnes Vikings on loan in the RFL Championship for the remainder of the 2022 season.

Leeds Rhinos
On 18 October 2022, Roberts joined Super League side Leeds Rhinos for the 2023 season, signing a two-year contract.

References

External links
Wales profile
Welsh profile

2002 births
Living people
English rugby league players
Rugby league players from Manchester
English people of Welsh descent
Leeds Rhinos players
Leigh Leopards players
Rugby league wingers
Salford Red Devils players
Swinton Lions players
Valencia Huracanes players
Wales national rugby league team players
Widnes Vikings players